The 2009 Budweiser Shootout was the first exhibition stock car race of the 2009 NASCAR Sprint Cup Series. The 31st annual running of the Budweiser Shootout, it was held on February 7, 2009, in Daytona Beach, Florida, at Daytona International Speedway, before a crowd of 80,000 people. The 78-lap race was won by Kevin Harvick of Richard Childress Racing, after he started from the next-to-last 27th position. Jamie McMurray of Roush Fenway Racing finished in second, and Stewart-Haas Racing's Tony Stewart was third.

Pole position starter Paul Menard was passed by Elliott Sadler on the third lap. Dale Earnhardt Jr. took the lead for the first time on lap four, and led a total of 23 laps, more than any other driver. Carl Edwards assumed the lead on lap 17, holding it until a caution flag was issued on lap 25. During the caution all the teams made a scheduled ten-minute pit stop. On the 41st lap, Earnhardt retook the lead, which he maintained until the 50th lap, when Matt Kenseth passed him. McMurray became the leader on lap 66, and held it until Harvick overtook him on the final lap to win the event.

The race was Harvick's first Sprint Cup Series victory since the 2007 Nextel All-Star Challenge, and Richard Childress Racing's first Budweiser Shootout win since the 1995 edition. Eight cautions were issued during the race, which saw an event-record 23 lead changes among 14 drivers, and attracted 8.3 million television viewers.

Background

The 2009 Budweiser Shootout was the first of two exhibition stock car races of the 2009 NASCAR Sprint Cup Series, and the 31st annual edition of the event. It was held on February 7, 2009, in Daytona Beach, Florida, at Daytona International Speedway, a superspeedway that holds NASCAR races. The standard track at Daytona International Speedway is a four-turn  superspeedway. The track's turns are banked at 31 degrees, while the front stretch, the location of the finish line, is banked at 18 degrees.

The Budweiser Shootout was created by Busch Beer brand manager Monty Roberts as the Busch Clash in 1979.  The race, designed to promote Busch Beer, invites the fastest NASCAR drivers from the previous season to compete. The race is considered a "warm-up" for the Daytona 500. It was renamed the Bud Shootout in 1998. The name changed to the Budweiser Shootout in 2001, the Sprint Unlimited in 2013 and the Advance Auto Parts Clash in 2017.

A total of 28 cars were eligible to compete in the race, including the top six teams based on owners' points from the 2008 season from each of the series four manufacturers (Chevrolet, Dodge, Ford, and Toyota). In addition to the first 24 cars eligible for competing, each of the four manufacturers received one "wild card" berth for a car or driver not already qualified, for previous Cup Series champions and past Shootout winners based on the 2008 owners' points. The race was 75 laps long (as opposed to 70 laps in the 2008 race), with two segments of 25 and 50 laps. In between the segments there was a ten-minute pit stop. During the pit stop, teams were able to change tires, add fuel, and make normal chassis adjustments, but they were not be allowed to change springs, shock absorbers or rear-ends. Also, all the work was done in either the garage or on pit road. Afterward, the race was restarted with one lap behind the pace car. The caution laps, as well as the green flag laps were scored in the race. Dale Earnhardt Jr. was the race's defending champion.

Practice and qualifying
Two practice sessions were held on the afternoon of February 6 before the race. The first session lasted 45 minutes, and the second 60 minutes. Kyle Busch was fastest in the first practice session, held in clear and cool weather conditions, with a time of 47.009 seconds, more than seven hundredths of a second faster than the second-placed Jimmie Johnson, who was recovering from a cut finger he sustained on his left hand while altering his racing uniform with a kitchen knife at the 2009 24 Hours of Daytona endurance race. Matt Kenseth was third fastest, ahead of Reed Sorenson, A. J. Allmendinger and Earnhardt Jr. Carl Edwards was seventh, still within one second of Kyle Busch's time. In the second practice session, Johnson was fastest at 46.724 seconds. Allmendinger, Earnhardt, Kasey Kahne, Tony Stewart, Greg Biffle, Bobby Labonte, Jamie McMurray, Kyle Busch and Scott Speed rounded out the top ten positions.

During the second practice session, Paul Menard was driving through the first turn when his right-rear tire deflated, causing him to spin sideways. Speed was close behind him, and although he slowed, he made contact with the right-front quarter panel of Menard's car. Both cars spun across the track, and stopped in the infield grass. Speed's vehicle had minor damage, but Menard's car was taken to the garage area. Menard was transported to the infield care center for treatment and was released soon after. Shortly after that, Sorenson made contact with the right-rear corner of Kyle Busch's vehicle with the front of his car, and his teammate Kahne sustained damage to his car's right-hand section from glancing a barrier beside the track at the first turn, Jeff Burton's engine failed on the third lap of his second practice session, and his team changed engines. Edwards also had to swerve to avoid hitting a chunk of debris that detached from David Reutimann's car at high speed.

For qualifying, the 28 drivers drew their starting positions by a lot, a feature that is unique to the event. Menard chose the pole position, ahead of Elliott Sadler, Sorenson, Speed and Denny Hamlin who rounded out the top five positions. Stewart drew sixth place, and Brian Vickers drew the seventh position. Bobby Labonte chose the eighth position, ahead of Earnhardt and Kyle Busch. Eleventh went to Edwards, and the next four places were drawn by Kurt Busch, Robby Gordon, Kahne, and McMurray. David Ragan, who drew sixteenth, was followed by Michael Waltrip, Allmendinger, Joey Logano, and David Stremme in the first 20 positions. Johnson, David Reutimann, Burton, Casey Mears, Kenseth, Biffle, Kevin Harvick, and Jeff Gordon chose the last eight starting positions in the event. Once the lot was completed, Menard commented, "That's pretty cool, By the time I drew there were about four numbers at the front and three back near 17th and 18th so I felt like I had a pretty good shot at getting a good starting position."

Qualifying results

Race
The 75-lap race began on February 7 at 8:10 p.m. Eastern Standard Time (UTC−05:00), and was televised live in the United States on Fox. Commentary was provided by lap-by-lap analyst Mike Joy, with analysis from three-time Cup Series champion Darrell Waltrip, and former crew chief Larry McReynolds. Around the start of the race, weather conditions were clear but cool. L. Ronald Durham, pastor of Greater Friendship Missionary Baptist Church in Daytona Beach, began pre-race ceremonies with an invocation. Vocalist Catina Mack from Orlando performed the national anthem, and country music singer Dierks Bentley commanded the drivers to start their engines. During the pace laps, Burton fell to the rear of the field because he changed his car's engine, and Logano did the same for missing the mandatory pre-race drivers' meeting due to him participating in the track's ARCA Re/Max Series race, which ended later than scheduled.

Menard held the lead going into the back stretch on lap one. On lap two, the top seven cars were in a single file until side-by-side racing began at the conclusion of the lap. Hamlin received assistance from Sadler to pass Menard for the lead on the third lap. On lap four, Earnhardt turned left to overtake Hamlin and move into first place. That same lap, Ragan appeared to slow behind Johnson; Robby Gordon made contact with Ragan's rear, sending him into the right-hand barrier. Speed, Logano and Mears were collected, causing the first caution. Biffle's car sustained minor cosmetic damage as the involved cars slid down the track, and Jeff Gordon avoided the multi-car accident. Logano and Speed immediately retired from the race because of the significant damage to their cars. The race restarted on lap nine, with Earnhardt leading and Sadler in second. Two laps later, Sadler passed Earnhardt to take the lead. He and Kurt Busch were first and second as the field began lap 13, but Stewart and Kahne moved into the first two positions exiting the first turn. Approaching the 14th lap Kahne slid up the circuit and narrowly avoided going into Hamlin's side, while Vickers and Harvick made contact with each other, but no caution was needed in both cases.

On lap 17, Hamlin temporarily took the lead from Stewart, but it was Edwards who held the first position at the conclusion of the lap. Stremme separated the field into two with his advance through it. Harvick slowed because he was forced into the right-hand wall, removing his front left fender, and fell five seconds behind the pack. At the end of the 22nd lap, Hamlin slid and regained control of his car into the turn-four tri-oval. On lap 23, Hamlin turned left on the back straight leaving turn two, but he hit Reutimann, who then clipped the front-right quarter of Stremme's car, spinning both drivers into the grass in the field, and  causing the second caution. Both drivers continued. During the caution, all of the teams made their compulsory ten minute pit stops, before returning to the track for the restart. Edwards led until his teammate McMurray overtook him on lap 26. Kahne took the lead on the 27th lap. He held it until Kyle Busch briefly passed him later that lap. Kyle Busch had no assistance from Johnson, and Kahne regained the lead. On lap 29, McMurray took the lead, but on the following lap lost it to Jeff Gordon on his left. McMurray regained the lead from Gordon on lap 31.

That lap, Jeff Gordon fell behind in the middle lane, and Vickers hit his car's rear. That caused Gordon to clip Biffle's rear and left-hand sides, sending him into Johnson's path, and collecting Mears, Burton, and Allmendinger; a third caution was issued, during which most of the leaders, including McMurray, made pit stops for fuel and tires. Kyle Busch led at the lap-36 restart. One lap later, Sorenson's engine failed, ending his race, and bringing out a fourth caution because of oil on the track. Earnhardt's teammate Jeff Gordon aided in a pass on Kyle Busch for the former to take the lead for the second time at the lap-41 restart. Earnhardt and Jeff Gordon created a single file as the former led the next eight laps. In the meantime, Waltrip was pushed by Sadler and hit the right-hand wall on the back straight. Kenseth overtook Earnhardt on lap 50, but Earnhardt regained the lead on the next lap. Five laps later, a fifth caution came out after a three-car accident involving Reutimann, Stremme, and Sadler going into the first turn. Every driver chose to make pit stops for fuel and tires. Edwards and Kyle Busch ran into the infield grass during the pit stops as the nearest drivers ran four abreast entering turn one.

Kyle Busch took the lead from Earnhardt at the pit stops, and held it at the lap-59 restart. On the next lap, Johnson helped his teammate Earnhardt reclaim the lead on the outside lane. Jeff Gordon took it on lap 61 before an oversteer dropped Earnhardt to the rear of the pack. Johnson led the next two laps until Vickers passed him exiting turn two on the 64th lap. On that lap, a sixth caution was prompted, as Menard lost control of his car leaving the fourth turn, collecting Earnhardt, who in turn hit Labonte on his way towards the right-hand wall. Biffle was hit by possibly Mears. McMurray led the field at the restart on lap 69, followed by Johnson and Kyle Busch. Leaving turn four, McMurray got loose in front of Johnson and Kyle Busch, but he retained the lead. Kenseth and Johnson steered to the left on the 71st lap, and McMurray responded by doing the same. Johnson fell to fifth after receiving a bump that sent him to the right. McMurray then held off Kenseth on the outside line during lap 72. On the next lap, Jeff Gordon went left to try and get ahead of McMurray, but did not succeed. McMurray's lead was reduced to nothing, as a seventh caution was necessitated on the 73rd lap, when Stremme slid into Biffle's rear, sending Biffle into the right-hand barrier; the two were connected until they reached the infield grass.

The race restarted on the 77th lap, for a green–white–checker finish (extending the race to 78 laps) with McMurray leading Jeff Gordon, Johnson, and Harvick. Exiting the first turn, a large amount of bump drafting occurred. On the final lap, Hamlin gave Harvick assistance on the right to maintain Harvick's momentum on the backstretch, enabling Harvick to pass McMurray for the lead. Behind the two, Johnson got loose from being bumped by Stewart, and slid into the side of Hamlin and Mears between turns three and four. Kahne then hit Kyle Busch's rear, and the two crashed. Vickers could not steer away, and was collected. The eighth (and final) caution came out, and the field was frozen in place, with the order of finish determined by where the drivers were when the caution began. This gave Harvick the victory. It was his first in the Cup Series since another exhibition event 71 races prior, the 2007 Nextel All-Star Challenge. It was also Richard Childress Racing's first Budweiser Shootout win since the 1995 edition. McMurray finished second, Stewart third, Jeff Gordon fourth, and Allmendinger fifth. Kahne, Edwards, Kenseth, Kurt Busch, and Kyle Busch completed the top ten. There were an event-record 23 lead changes among a record 14 different drivers during the course of the race. Earnhardt led four times for a total of 23 laps, more than any other driver. Harvick led once for a single lap.

Post-race comments

Harvick appeared in Victory Lane to celebrate his win in front of the crowd of 80,000 people; the win earned him $200,000. He said the win was reminiscent of his final-lap pass on Mark Martin in the 2007 Daytona 500 and a multi-car accident occurred behind him: "We got behind early, lost the draft and I was thinking, ‘Man, we won the Daytona 500 the same way,’ Just never giving up. If that's not fun to watch, I don't know what is. I had gotten squeezed up in the wall and knocked the left-front fender off. It seemed like we were in the wrong spot for the whole race. But we ended up in the right place when it mattered." McMurray said he was disappointed to lose the win after failing to block Harvick. "I saw (Harvick) coming, I moved up and I thought I was high enough," he said. "I didn't think there was room between him and the wall, and he just snuck in there. You feel like a sucker when you're in the front of this deal." Stewart, who finished third in his first race as a team owner, spoke of his satisfaction with the result with his new crew chief Darian Grubb: "It really put me at ease I guess the whole night. Just hearing his confidence on the radio gave me confidence. We led laps tonight. We were a factor at parts of the night. I think everybody at some point of the night was vulnerable and able to fall to the back and get freight-trained."

Ragan suggested that Robby Gordon had lost focus when he hit him on lap five. "It's just a typical deal here at Daytona and Talladega", he said. "When someone gets checked up usually two or three rows back someone doesn't see it." Logano said of his involvement in the accident, "You start in the back and that's kind of what happens, [I] just saw one [car] get loose, checked up and then saw he was coming down so I floored ahead to the apron and just [got] clipped enough to send me back head-on into the wall." Speed called the crash an instance of being in the "wrong place" at the "wrong time" and referred to his second practice session accident with Menard. "Kind of a thing that happens around here – it's racing. The cars are so heavy and they're going so fast it's not actually a lot of reacting that you can do. Sometimes it works out and you go through there looking like a hero and sometimes it doesn't. It didn't work out the best, but still it's better than nothing."

Some drivers and crew chiefs raised concerns during and after the event about the handling of the Car of Tomorrow on Daytona International Speedway's variable track surface. Kyle Busch argued the car was not suitable for the track because of balance difficulties, and Labonte said it was "pretty erratic" and its handling was not to his liking. McMurray said he did not feel any loss of vehicle control. Todd Parrott, Labonte's crew chief, stated his belief that there were few handling changes from previous editions of the race, and Reutimann concurred. "I wouldn't say it's much different than usual", he said. "They're kind of a handful, which is kind of how they are." The race attracted 8,300,000 million television viewers, and drew a final Nielsen rating with a 4.9 rating over a 9 share. It took one hour, 31 minutes, and 57 seconds to complete; because it ended under caution, no margin of victory was recorded.

Race results

References

Budweiser Shootout
Budweiser Shootout
Budweiser Shootout
NASCAR races at Daytona International Speedway